Tagetes is a genus  of 50 species of annual or perennial, mostly herbaceous plants in the family Asteraceae. They are among several groups of plants known in English as marigolds. The genus Tagetes was described by Carl Linnaeus in 1753.

These plants are native to Mexico, growing naturally since Mexico's valley down to the south and even reaching several other Latinamerican countries, but some species have become naturalized around the world. One species, T. minuta, is considered a noxious invasive plant in some areas.

Description
Tagetes species vary in size from 0.1 to 2.2 m tall. Most species have pinnate green leaves.  Blooms naturally occur in golden, orange, yellow, and white colors, often with maroon highlights. Floral heads are typically (1-) to 4–6 cm diameter, generally with both ray florets and disc florets. In horticulture, they tend to be planted as annuals, although the perennial species are gaining popularity. They have fibrous roots.

Depending on the species, Tagetes species grow well in almost any sort of soil. Most horticultural selections grow best in soil with good drainage, and some cultivars are known to have good tolerance to drought.

Nomenclature
The Latin Tagētes derives from the name of the Etruscan Tages, born from the plowing of the earth. It likely refers to the ease with which plants of this genus come out each year either by the seeds produced in the previous year, or by the stems which regrow from the stump already in place.

The common name in English, marigold, is derived from Mary's gold, a name first applied to a similar plant native to Europe, Calendula officinalis.

The most commonly cultivated varieties of Tagetes are known variously as African marigolds (usually referring to cultivars and hybrids of Tagetes erecta), or French marigolds (usually referring to hybrids and cultivars of Tagetes patula, many of which were developed in France). The so-called signet marigolds are hybrids derived mostly from Tagetes tenuifolia.

Cultivation and uses

Depending on the species, marigold foliage has a musky, pungent scent, though some varieties have been bred to be scentless. It is said to deter some common insect pests, as well as nematodes. Tagetes species — notably T. patula — are hence often used in companion planting for tomato, eggplant, chili pepper, tobacco, and potato. Due to antibacterial thiophenes exuded by the roots, Tagetes should not be planted near any legume crop.  Some of the perennial species are deer-, rabbit-, rodent- and javelina or peccary-resistant.

T. minuta (khakibush or huacatay), originally from South America, has been used as a source of essential oil for the perfume and industry known as tagette or "marigold oil", and as a flavourant in the food and tobacco industries.  It is commonly cultivated in South Africa, where the species is also a useful pioneer plant in the reclamation of disturbed land.

The florets of Tagetes erecta are rich in the orange-yellow carotenoid lutein and are used as a food colour (INS number E161b) in the European Union for foods such as pasta, vegetable oil, margarine, mayonnaise, salad dressing, baked goods, confectionery, dairy products, ice cream, yogurt, citrus juice and mustard. In the United States, however, the powders and extracts are only approved as colorants in poultry feed.

Marigolds are recorded as a food plant for some Lepidoptera caterpillars including the dot moth, and a nectar source for other butterflies and bumblebees. They are often part of butterfly gardening plantings.  In the wild, many species are pollinated by beetles.

Cultural significance

Tagetes lucida
The species Tagetes lucida, known as pericón, is used to prepare a sweetish, anise-flavored medicinal tea in Mexico.  It is also used as a culinary herb in many warm climates, as a substitute for tarragon, and offered in the nursery as "Texas tarragon" or "Mexican mint marigold".

Tagetes minuta
Tagetes minuta, native to southern South America, is a tall, upright marigold plant with small flowers used as a culinary herb in Peru, Ecuador, and parts of Chile and Bolivia, where it is called by the Incan term huacatay. The paste is used to make the popular potato dish called ocopa.  Having both "green" and "yellow/orange" notes, the taste and odor of fresh T. minuta is like a mixture of sweet basil, tarragon, mint and citrus.
It is also used as a medicinal tea for gastrointestinal complaints and specifically against nematodes.

Tagetes – various species

The marigold was regarded as the flower of the dead in pre-Hispanic Mexico, parallel to the lily in Europe, and is still widely used in the Day of the Dead celebrations.

Another variety of marigold called pot marigold (Calendula officinalis) was historically used in ancient Greek, Roman, Middle Eastern, and Indian cultures as a medicinal herb, as well as a dye for fabrics, foods, and cosmetics. Many of these uses persist today. They are also used to make oil that protects the skin.

During the colonial period the native varieties of these flowers were replaced by American species like T. erecta, T. patula, and T. tenuifolia. The marigold is also widely cultivated in India and Thailand, particularly the species T. erecta, Tagetes patula, and T. tenuifolia. It is always sold in the markets for daily worships and rituals.

Vast quantities of marigolds are used in garlands and decoration for weddings, festivals, and religious events. Marigold cultivation is extensively seen in Telangana, Andhra Pradesh, Tamil Nadu, West Bengal, Karnataka, and Uttar Pradesh (for the Deepawali market) states of India.

In Ukraine, chornobryvtsi (T. erecta, T. patula, and the signet marigold, l. tenuifolia) are regarded as one of the national symbols, and are often mentioned in songs, poems, and tales.

Species
 Accepted species

Gallery

References

External links
 
 Marigold Commercial Greenhouse Production
 Growing African Marigolds
 North Carolina Extension Gardener Plant Toolbox

 
Asteraceae genera
Butterfly food plants
Mexican culture
Plant dyes